Graham is a populated place situated in Graham County, Arizona, United States.

The first settlement at Graham was made in 1880 by a colony of Mormons. A post office called Graham was established in 1882, and remained in operation until 1885.  The community takes its name from Graham County.

References

Populated places in Graham County, Arizona